Raja Ranguski is a 2018 Tamil-language thriller drama film directed by Dharani Dharan, starring Shirish Saravanan and Chandini Tamilarasan. The film also stars Anupama Kumar in an important role. The film has music composed by Yuvan Shankar Raja. Chandini plays title role of Ranguski in this film. This film received generally positive reviews.

Plot
Raja is a police constable who lives with his colleague Baskar. He falls in love with an aspiring writer named Ranguski. He often visits Maria, a senior citizen living in a villa community who has demanded police protection as she is an antique collector and possesses many valuable things. Maria and Ranguski live in the same housing complex. Raja tries to woo Ranguski by making her prank calls in the name of a stranger and forcing her to love him instead. As Ranguski is frustrated by this, she falls in love with Raja. To Raja's surprise, he finds that Ranguski still gets such calls from a stranger. Soon, he too gets such calls, and the caller threatens to kill Ranguski. Raja rushes to Ranguski's home to save her, but he finds out that the killer has killed Maria instead. With circumstances proving that Raja is the killer, he plans with Baskar and Ranguski to find the real killer. They deduce that the killer is part of the villa community too. When Raja goes to meet a photographer who claimed to know who the real killer is, he finds the latter has been murdered. Raja is then arrested by CBCID officer, KK.

However, Raja manages to escape custody and reunites with Ranguski and Baskar. He tells them while at Maria's house on the day of murder, he saw a man with a tattoo on his forearm. They then track down that man, John. John says that he went to Maria's house looking for the highly valuable Gutenberg Bible but found her already dead.

Raja then asks Ranguski to meet KK and hand over a recording of John's confession to him. They then find John dead. Raja receives a call again which seems to indicate that Ranguski has been kidnapped. Raja and Baskar are then rounded up by the police. However, Raja fights off the police and runs away to find his friend Shiva. Shiva tells him that the last location of Ranguski's phone was at a church in Cheyur. Raja visits the church and meets Maria's twin sister Mary, who reveals that Ranguski is the one who committed all the murders and framed Raja.

Meanwhile, Ranguski, in possession of the Gutenberg Bible, meets the buyers, the contact she got from John before killing him. While trying to escape with the money, she is shot by the police and dies in Raja's arms.

Cast

Shirish Saravanan as Raja
Chandini Tamilarasan as Ranguski aka Regina William 
Anupama Kumar as Maria and Mary
Kalloori Vinoth as Baskar
Jayakumar Janakiraman as K.K
Sathya as Arokkiyam
Sayee Sekar as John
Madhu Raghuram as Madhu
Vijay Senathipathi as Raja Raam
Gopi Gpr as Gopi
Ravichandren as Perumal
DuraiPandi as Kumar

Production
Dharani Dharan and Shirish, who made his acting debut with Metro (2016), announced that they would make a film together during September 2016. The following month, Yuvan Shankar Raja was signed on to work as the music composer, a move which raised the profile of the project. In late December 2016, Pooja Devariya was signed on to portray the lead female role, while the title was revealed to be Raja Ranguski, with the end of the name taken from writer Sujatha's pen name and the mosquito's name from Enthiran (2010). Production began during the first week of January, with the team suggesting that they would shoot for two straight months to wrap up filming work. A few days after the shoot began, Devariya was replaced by Chandini Tamilarasan after the former fell ill. The team were not able to delay the shoot and subsequently opted to sign on a new actress to keep to their schedule. Anupama Kumar joined the team to essay an important role. The much awaited official trailer of 'Raja Ranguski' has hit the web and has already begun trending. Director Dharani Dharan who has given us films like ‘Burma’, ‘Jackson Durai’ is all set to engage us with a cop investigative thriller in 'Raja Ranguski'.

Soundtrack 
Pattukutty Neethaan

References

External links

 

 Listen Raja Ranguski Songs

2018 films
2018 thriller films
Indian thriller films
Films scored by Yuvan Shankar Raja
2010s Tamil-language films
Indian thriller drama films